Jawahar Navodaya Vidyalaya, Kothali (JNVK) is a boarding school near Belagavi, Belagavi, India. JNVK is funded by the Ministry of Human Resource Development (India).

History
The school was established in the year 1986 in the campus of Acharya Deshbhushan by the Navodaya Vidyalaya Samiti, an autonomous body which comes under the Ministry of Human Resource and Development New Delhi. Later the school shifted to its own  campus in between the villages Kothali and Kuppanwadi in 1989. This school is administered and monitored by Hyderabad regional office of Navodaya Vidyalaya Smiti.

Campus
The school stands on a  campus near Kothali village, and also very near to Shanti Giri, a Jain ashram. The campus has several buildings, an administration block, main class room buildings, Laboratory building, workshops, teachers' quarters, students' dormitories, principal's house, guest house, common mess, sports ground, Power house and water tank.

Affiliations 
JNV Belgaum is affiliated to Central Board of Secondary Education with affiliation number 840002, following the curriculum prescribed by CBSE.

References

External links
not available

Jawahar Navodaya Vidyalayas in Karnataka
Educational institutions established in 1986
1986 establishments in Karnataka
Boarding schools in Karnataka
Schools in Belagavi district